Beeley Wood is a woodland in the north of the City of Sheffield, near Middlewood, South Yorkshire, England. It is one of 35 ancient woodland areas within the Sheffield city boundary. An ancient woodland is defined as a site that has been continuously occupied by woodland from the year 1600 or before.

Overview
The woods are situated on the eastern side of the River Don between the village of Oughtibridge and the Sheffield suburb of Middlewood. The most common access from the Middlewood end of the wood is from the end of Clay Wheels Lane or from Middlewood Road South over the Don by the Rocher footbridge. The wood is traversed by two public footpaths;the lower of these is a pleasant and recently re-covered riverside walk which is part of the Upper Don Walk, a scenic walk by the river from the centre of Sheffield to Oughtibridge. The other public footpath runs the length of the upper wood at its highest point; there are many other paths not marked on the OS map. Beeley Wood is traversed by the famous Woodhead railway line; there is one level crossing and one footbridge for pedestrians to cross the line. The woods are home to a large colony of bats and all three species of woodpecker native to Britain can be seen in the woods. In spring there is a large covering of bluebells on the woodland floor. Wilson Spring Wood, a small area of wood, classed as an ancient and semi natural woodland, measuring approximately  lies to the north-east of the main wood, separated by an area of farmers' fields  in width.

History
The earliest written reference to Beeley Wood is in a deed dated from 1161 in which the monks of Ecclesfield Priory were given permission to graze their flock every year from January to Easter in a large wood stretching from Birley Edge down to the River Don. Beeley Wood is a surviving part of this large wood and part of it is still called Priory Wood. In this 12th century document the wood was referred to as "BYLLHAUWODE" which is derived from the two Old English words Billa and haga and means Billa's enclosure and suggests that the woodland was originally attached to an Anglo-Saxon farm belonging to Billa. Further mention was made in a document released upon the death of Thomas de Furnival in 1332 when Beeley Wood was named as one of eleven locations under the heading of Woods, Moors and Commons. Under this agreement people were allowed to graze their animals in the wood. However, by the 16th century Beeley Wood had become a coppice wood in which the pasturing of animals was discouraged. At the end of the 16th century Beeley Wood was one of eleven coppice woods in Sheffield which were mentioned in a document drawn up for Gilbert Talbot, 7th Earl of Shrewsbury. 

By the 1890s the coppicing of Beeley Wood along with the other coppice woods in Sheffield was coming to an end because of reduced profits and woodland management problems. The wood was allowed to become a "high forest" with the strongest growth of a coppiced tree allowed to grow into a fully grown standard tree. Many of the older and sickly trees were cleared away at this time and replaced by saplings of trees that were not native to the Sheffield area, such as beech, sweet chestnut, common lime and sycamore. The young trees were ordered from a nursery in Cheshire and were delivered to Wadsley Bridge railway station. In 2011 the Forestry Commission approved funding for a five-year plan to improve the unmanaged habitat of the wood; under the scheme an area of  will be coppiced and a further  will be thinned to allow more light and warmth into the wood and therefore improve conditions for wild flowers, insects and birds. In February 2016 the Environment Agency removed the middle two-thirds of Beeley Wood Lower Weir on the River Don as part of a scheme to allow the free migration of fish and let the river return to a more natural form.

Mining and quarrying
Although not apparent today, Beeley Wood was once an area of industry with mining and quarrying taking place. Ganister was the material that was mined; this is a type of hard sandstone used in the manufacture of silica bricks used to line industrial furnaces. The Drift mining method was used because of the slope of the land in Beeley Wood and the mines went into the hillside for a long way and to a great depth. The fact that the wood is on a slope enabled gravity trackways to be used to transport the Ganister down to the valley bottom. The Ganister was also quarried in at least one location in the woods and the overgrown remnants of a large quarry can still be seen today. The largest of the mines was the Beeley Wood Mine, owned by the Silica Fire Brick Company and managed by J.T. Minnis for many years, in the 1920s and 1930s over 30 workers were employed and 12 ponies were used. In recent years the Coal Authority have inspected and fenced off various old shafts in the upper part of the wood.

Other industry
There is other industry on the eastern (Middlewood) fringes of the wood with the Beeley Wood Works situated at the end of Clay Wheels Lane, this is currently occupied by the Abbey Stainless Steel Company but has a long history dating back to 1749 when it was known as the Nova Scotia Tilt Company. For many years there was a large Union Carbide factory (formerly owned by British Acheson Electrodes Ltd., formerly Electrode Company of Sheffield Ltd.) in this area manufacturing carbon electrodes for the steel industry, graphite rods for the nuclear industry and related products but this closed several years ago with the site lying disused for some time.  In 1976 the plant employed 850 people with a subsidiary works in Wincobank, Sheffield, employing a further 150 people. The  site received planning permission in January 2009 to be used as a "Recycling Village" run by the firm Ballast Phoenix Ltd. who will initially recycle the ash from Sheffield's main Energy from Waste incinerator.

References

External links
The management behind the Beeleywood site

Parks in Sheffield
Forests and woodlands of South Yorkshire